Trumbull is a town located in Fairfield County, Connecticut, United States. It borders on the cities of Bridgeport and Shelton and the towns of Stratford, Fairfield, Easton and Monroe. The population was 36,827 during the 2020 census. Trumbull was the home of the Golden Hill Paugussett Indian Nation for thousands of years before the English settlement was made in 1639. The town was named after Jonathan Trumbull (1710–1785), a merchant, patriot and statesman when it was incorporated in 1797. Aviation pioneer Igor Sikorsky lived in Trumbull during his active years when he designed, built, and flew fixed-wing aircraft and put the helicopter into mass production for the first time.

History

The area comprising the town of Trumbull was occupied by the Paugusset Indian nation for thousands of years before English colonists arrived here during the Great Migration from England and established the town of Stratford, Connecticut, in 1639.

In 1725, Stratford residents living in the northern part of the town petitioned the Colony of Connecticut to establish their own separate village. They wished to call their new village Nickol's Farms, after the family who lived in its center. However, the Colony named it Unity instead. The village of Unity merged with the village to its west called Long Hill (organized in 1740), to form the town of "North Stratford" in 1744.

In the late 1780s, North Stratford began to petition the Connecticut General Assembly seeking independence from Stratford. The Assembly finally granted full town rights in October 1797 and named the new town after Jonathan Trumbull (1710–1785), a merchant, patriot, statesman and slave owner when it was incorporated in 1797. Aviation pioneer Igor Sikorsky lived in Trumbull during his active years when he designed, built, and flew fixed-wing aircraft and put the helicopter into mass production for the first time.

Geography

Bodies of water
The Pequonnock River is the only major waterway in Trumbull, beginning northwest of Old Mine Park at the Monroe border and flowing southeasterly through the Pequonnock River Valley State Park, Trumbull Center and Twin Brooks Park. The river leaves Trumbull and continues into Beardsley Park in Bridgeport.

Major bodies of water include Canoe Brook Lake, Pinewood Lake, Tashua Hills Golf Club Pond, and the six Twin Brooks Park ponds. Minor bodies of water include Curtiss (Secret) Pond, Dogwood Lake, Frog Pond, Kaatz Pond, Kaechele Pond, Porters Pond, Thrush Wood Lake and Unity Park Pond.

Land

According to the U.S. Geological Society, at 615 ft Monitor Hill (Tashua Hill) in Trumbull is the highest coastal point on the east coast of the United States. It is marked with a plaque on Monitor Hill Road.

Parks
Trumbull has  of park facilities. These areas include:

 Abraham Nichols Park/Wood's Estate
 Aldo Memorial Park (Westwind Road)
 Robert G. Beach Memorial Park
 Davidow Park
 Great Oak Park
 Gunther Pond Park
 Indian Ledge Park
 Island Brook Park
 Kaatz Pond Park
 Kaechele Soccer Fields
 Long Hill Green
 Middlebrooks Park
 Mischee Brook Park
 Nothnagle Memorial Field
 Old Mine Park (Historic Mine Area Dedication)
 Parlor Rock Historic Amusement Area
 Strawberry Brook Estates
 Tashua Recreation Area
 Twin Brooks Park
 Unity Park

State parks 
The town of Trumbull, the Connecticut Department of Environmental Protection and the Bridgeport Hydraulic Company agreed to make a joint Town and State purchase of land in the Pequonnock River Valley in 1989. The  parcel cost $9,275,000 and is maintained by the Department of Environmental Protection.

Neighborhoods

Daniels Farm
Long Hill
Nichols
Tashua
Trumbull Center

Demographics

As of the census of 2000, there were 34,243 people, 11,911 households, and 9,707 families residing in the town. The racial makeup of the town was 94.02% White, 2.70% Black or African American, 0.11% Native American, 2.38% Asian, 0.02% Pacific Islander, 0.71% from other races, and 0.88% from two or more races. Hispanic or Latino of any race were 1.88% of the population.

There were 11,911 households, out of which 37.5% had children under the age of 18 living within them, 71.7% were married couples living together, 7.4% had a female householder with no husband present, and 18.5% were non-families. 16.2% of all households were made up of individuals, and 9.6% had someone living alone who was 65 years of age or older.  The average household size was 2.82 and the average family size was 3.17.

In the town, the population was spread out, with 26.0% under the age of 18, 5.0% from 18 to 24, 27.6% from 25 to 44, 24.1% from 45 to 64, and 17.3% who were 65 years of age or older.  The median age was 40 years. For every 100 females, there were 92.7 males.  For every 100 females age 18 and over, there were 88.9 males. As of the 2000 census, males had a median income of $62,201 versus $41,384 for females. The per capita income for the town was $34,931.  About 1.4% of families and 2.3% of the population were below the poverty line, including 2.4% of those under age 18 and 3.6% of those over age 65.

2008 estimates
According to the American Community Survey (ACS) 2008 estimate, there were 37,134 people, 12,338 households, and 10,021 families residing in the town.
The population density was 1,593.73 people per square mile. There were 12,651 housing units (93% ownership, 7% rental) with an average density of 542.9 per square mile.

There were 12,338 households, out of which 40.9% had children under the age of 18 living within them, 69% were married couples living together, 7.9% had a female householder with no husband present, and 18.8% were non-families. 17.7% of all households were made up of individuals, and 11.1% had someone living alone who was 65 years of age or older. The average household size was 2.90 and the average family size was 3.31.

In the town, the population includes 25.5% under the age of 18 and 20.1% who were 65 years of age or older. The median age was 43.4 years. For every 100 females, there were 87.6 males. For every 100 females age 18 and over, there were 85.8 males.

The median income for a household in the town was $103,082, and the median income for a family was $115,686.The per capita income for the town was $46,307. About 1.7% of families and 2.6% of the population were below the poverty line, including 3.6% of those under age 18 and 2.8% of those over age 65.

The racial makeup of the town was 92.0% White, 4.1% Asian, 2.9% Black or African American, 0.5% from other races, and 0.5% from two or more races. Hispanic or Latino of any race were 3.70% of the population. The ten largest ethnicities were Italian 11,025 (29.70%), Irish 9,166 (24.70%), German 4,363 (11.70%), English 3,112 (8.40%), Polish 2,762 (7.40%),  Russian 1,558 (4.20%), Hungarian 1,447 (3.90%), French (except Basque) 1,087 (2.90%), Portuguese 885 (2.40%), & Slovak 881 (2.40%).

Places of worship
St. Catherine of Sienna Church (Trumbull, Connecticut)

Notable locations

Bicentennial fountain and time capsule
The town's Bicentennial fountain is located at the corner of Quality Street and Church Hill Road (Connecticut Route 127), near the main branch of the library and the town hall. It features the Trumbull town seal and a memorial plaque of donors. In 1997 a time capsule was laid at the base of the Bicentennial Fountain with an opening date of October 12, 2097, Trumbull's tricentennial.

On the National Register of Historic Places

 Christ Episcopal Church and Tashua Burial Ground – 5170 Madison Ave. (added May 25, 2001)
 David Mallett Jr. House – 420 Tashua Road (added March 20, 1986)
 Nichols Farms Historic District – Center Road, 1681–1944 Huntington Turnpike, 5–34 Priscilla Place, and 30–172 Shelton Road (added September 20, 1987)
 Old Mine Park Archeological Site (added 1990)

Economics
The revised town budget for 2009–2010 is $140,054,187.23.
For 2009, Trumbull maintained a AA bond rating on $26.3 million in new general obligation issues. The total of Trumbull GOs is $98.1 million. Trumbull has approximately 1400 businesses.

Commerce

Shopping 
The Westfield Trumbull Mall is located on Route 111, or Main Street, on the town boundary with Bridgeport, has over 180 stores including Target, J.C. Penney and Macy's.

The Hawley Lane Mall is located on Hawley Lane south of Route 8 on the town boundary with Stratford and features Best Buy, Kohl's and Target.

Corporate and industrial parks 
Located north of the Merritt Parkway and east of Route 8 near the town boundary with Shelton and Stratford,  of commercial space is zoned and includes offices for large firms such as Helicopter Support, Sun Products, Unilever, and United Healthcare. It is also home to the Market Integrity office of the NASDAQ OMX Group.

Economic development

Planning and Zoning Regulations 

Professional Office Overlay Zones (formerly Design Districts) have been established on certain areas along White Plains Road (Route 127), Church Hill Road and Main Street (Route 111). A combination Business Commercial Multi-Family Residential Zone, or Mixed-use, has been created around the historic Long Hill Green (dating to 1720), to encourage new commercial development.

Adaptive reuse has been adopted to permit the reuse of all antique structures situated on state numbered roads which have been previously occupied by a non-conforming use, or are deemed historic by the town, and for which uses allowed by the existing zones are no longer viable—resulting in structures that may become badly maintained, under-utilized, vacant or demolished by neglect.

Blight Ordinance 
The town amended its Municipal Code effective on October 1, 2012, to establish a Blight Prevention Ordinance pursuant to Section 7-148(c) (7) (H) (xv) of the Municipal Powers Act of the State of Connecticut General Statutes. This new ordinance encourages the rehabilitation of blighted premises by prohibiting any owner(s), or occupant(s) of real property from; allowing, creating, maintaining or causing the creation or maintenance of a blighted premises.

Taxes
The town's grand list assesses the taxable value in Trumbull at $5.114 billion, with a 2017 mill rate of 33.39. The cumulative value of Trumbull real estate is $4.615 billion.

Infrastructure

Transportation

Roads 
Route 8 runs through the southeast part of town. Route 8 is a freeway that leads to Waterbury and Interstate 84, continues into Massachusetts as Massachusetts Route 8 and finally terminates in Searsburg, Vermont. Nichols residents petitioned the legislature and won a bypass for Route 8 which was initially proposed to be built directly through the center of the historic village in the early 1900s.
Route 15, the historic Merritt Parkway, runs north (east) to New Haven (eventually connecting to Interstate 91) and south (west) towards New York City. Route 15 was built through Nichols center displacing a home, the old Nichols Store and Trinity Episcopal Church in 1939.
Route 25 runs north to south, merging with Route 8 at the Bridgeport line and continues overlapped with Route 8 (commonly known as the Route 8/25 connector) into Bridgeport ending at Interstate 95. Continuing north on Route 25, the freeway ends as it crosses Route 111 and continues as a surface road towards I-84 in Newtown leading to Danbury.
Route 108, also known as Nichols Avenue and Huntington Turnpike, heads north into Trumbull from Stratford at Hawley Lane. The Nichols Avenue portion in Trumbull was completed and its dimensions and abutting landowners were entered into the land records on December 7, 1696, making it the third oldest documented highway in Connecticut. It terminates in Shelton at the intersection with Route 110 (Howe Avenue). Route 108 can be reached via exit 52 from Route 15 or exit 8 from Route 8.
Route 111, also known as Main Street, begins at the intersection of Route 15 (exit 48) at the North End of Bridgeport. In 1801, the road connecting Bridgeport to Newtown was called the Bridgeport and Newtown Turnpike. From 1826 to 1852, the road from Trumbull to Stevenson was chartered as a turnpike and called the Monroe and Zoar Bridge Turnpike. Route 111 terminates at Route 34 in Monroe. Prior to the last section of the Route 25 highway opening in 1982, the portion of the current Route 111 from Route 15 to the intersection with the northern terminus of the divided-highway section of Route 25 was known as Route 25 instead of Route 111, with Route 111 starting at the Route 25 intersection.
Route 127, also known as White Plains Road and Church Hill Road, runs through the town center from south to north from the East Side of Bridgeport. The section in Trumbull was laid out to Pulpit Rock in 1705. Route 127 ends at the intersection of Main Street (Route 111) at the Town Hall.

Bus 
The Greater Bridgeport Transit Authority provides bus service for Trumbull.

Train 
Three train stations are located near Trumbull:
 Bridgeport, 4.6 miles away.
 Stratford, 4.9 miles away.
 Fairfield Metro, 5.7 miles away.
All three stations are served by Metro-North's New Haven Line. Bridgeport's station is served by Amtrak's Northeast Corridor and the Vermonter. All are easily accessible by bus routes or driving. The New Haven Railroad used to serve the town.

Education

Public education 
Public schools are managed by the Trumbull Public Schools System and include approximately 6,955 students, 450 teachers and 240 staff. The district has been ranked 18th (of 164) in Connecticut by the National Center for Education Statistics.

The system includes Trumbull High School, which is also home to an Agriscience & Biotechnology program, the Alternative High School, and REACH. Trumbull has two middle schools: Hillcrest Middle School and Madison Middle School. The six elementary schools in town include Booth Hill Elementary, Daniels Farm Elementary, Frenchtown Elementary, Jane Ryan Elementary School, Middlebrook Elementary, and Tashua Elementary. The Trumbull Early Childhood Education Center serves as the town's pre-school.

Private education 

Trumbull has several private schools, including the (non-denominational) Christian Heritage School (K–12) and (Catholic) St. Catherine of Siena School (K–8), St. Joseph High School, and St. Theresa School (K–8). A private pre-school, the Montessori Center for Early Learning, is located in Trumbull.

Continuing education 
Trumbull provides adult education in a variety of subjects at Trumbull High School, typically in the early evening.

Emergency services

Emergency Medical Services 
Trumbull EMS is a combined volunteer/paid organization founded in 1976. Trumbull EMS Headquarters is at 250 Middlebrooks Avenue. Today, the organization is a town operated entity, operating as a "third service" with paid staff being town employees. Trumbull EMS is part of the Sponsor Council Hospitals of Greater Bridgeport region. Their fleet of vehicles includes three Chevrolet Type III ambulances, two Mercedes Benz Sprinter Type II ambulances, two Chevy Tahoe paramedic fly-cars, and one Ford Police Interceptor Utility style command vehicle. EMT-B and EMT re-certification classes are regularly offered.

Fire departments 
Firefighting in the town of Trumbull is served by three independent and all-volunteer fire departments. Each fire department handles its own tax structure and fundraising but receives no funding from the town. There are a total of seven fire stations, equipped with an apparatus fleet of six engines, three ladder trucks (including one quint), three rescues, two squads, two fireboats, one town-wide command trailer, five utility units, and numerous support units. The current Town Fire Marshal is Megan Murphy.
Long Hill Fire District (since 1921)
Nichols Fire District (since 1917)
Trumbull Center Fire District (since 1925)

Fire station locations and apparatus

Police department 
The Trumbull Police Department was created in 1941 through an act of the State Legislature. It is under the jurisdiction of a six-member Board of Police Commissioners appointed by the First Selectman. The department currently has eighty officers and ten civilian workers, including the dog warden. The current Chief of Police is Micahel Lombardo. The police department is located at 158 Edison Road. The 2009–2010 revised departmental budget is $6,819,421.00.

Government and politics

Historically, Trumbull was a reliably Republican stronghold in presidential elections. However, the town has seen a few swings in favor of the Democrats in recent years. In 2008, John McCain only carried the town by 0.86%
 In 2016, Hillary Clinton only lost by 2.28%. In 2020, Democrat Joe Biden won.

Notable sport teams
The National Little League of Trumbull defeated the Kang-Tu Little League of Kaohsiung, Taiwan, in the championship game of the 1989 Little League World Series.

Activities and organizations
The Nichols Improvement Association was founded in 1889 and has  of open space. Its gazebo is used for wedding pictures, social gatherings and for the sale of Christmas trees.
The course features a driving range, two putting greens, pro shop, locker rooms, Eagle's Nest Grille restaurant and banquet facility. There is also Tashua Glen, a 9-hole "Executive style" course opened in 2004. Both courses feature cart paths. There is a Men's Club, Senior Men's Club, Ladies 9-holer, and Ladies 18-holer organizations active at the course.
The Trumbull Community Women is a group dedicated to promoting civic service. It is open to all women over 18, and runs a Young Women's Club as well. They meet at the Trumbull Library Community Room, generally on the first Tuesday of the month September through June.
The Town Hall Gazebo is host to concerts, mainly on Tuesday nights during the Summer.
The Trumbull Historical Society, founded in 1964, maintains a museum of Trumbull's past at 1856 Huntington Turnpike on the site of Abraham Nichols farm.
The Trumbull Nature & Arts Center is located at 7115 Main Street and coordinate trips for fishing, butterfly searches, gardening, outdoor photography and other nature related activities.
The Trumbull Teen Center was located at the barn at Indian Ledge Park and featured activities such as air hockey, Foosball, local band concerts, ping pong and basketball for Trumbull residents. The barn has not served as a teen center for several years, but there are efforts underway to reopen it.
Trumbull's Senior Center is located at 23 Priscilla Place. The senior transportation department continues to provide effective door-to-door services to seniors age 60 and over without transportation or unable to drive. Services include doctor’ s appointments, shopping, nutrition program, dentist appointments and legal appointments. It provides a variety of resources such as Continuing Education and Social Services as well as activities.
The Society Farsharotu, an Aromanian cultural organization, has its headquarters at Trumbull.

Library 
The Trumbull Library System (TLS) is the town's main lending library with a staff of fifteen and two locations. The library features online book searches & renewal, statewide inter-library loan, adult & youth sections, and several meeting rooms. Internet terminals and photocopy machines are also available for use. Various groups utilize the library for meetings and workshops. The catalog of the library includes over 148,000 printed materials, 10,000 video materials, 4,500 audio materials and 200 subscriptions available as audio books on CD/tape/MP3, books, DVD's, graphic novels, magazines, music CD's, and VHS tapes. Annual circulation exceeds 373,000 transactions.

There are two branches of the library:
 The Trumbull Library (main branch) is adjacent to Town Hall at 33 Quality Street.
 The Fairchild-Nichols Memorial Library is located at 1718 Huntington Turnpike.

Media

Local outlets 
 Trumbull Community Television, is available via Charter Cable on channel 17 and via Frontier Communications on channel 99. The Educational-access television cable TV station's programming features coverage of school events and programs, Government-access television (GATV) provides coverage of all town government commissions, boards and legislative meetings. It also provides emergency announcements, community information and announcements regarding town services. 
 Public-access television is available via Charter Cable Community Vision 192.
 The Trumbull Times is the local community newspaper, published weekly on Thursdays.

Movies filmed in Trumbull 
 Isn't it Delicious?, Independent film (2011)
 A Dance for Grace (2010)
 Revolutionary Road (2008)
 Oprah Winfrey presents For One More Day which aired on ABC in December 2007

Accolades
Family Circle magazine has ranked Trumbull 7th in their "10 Best Towns for Families" 2011. U.S. News & World Report magazine has ranked Trumbull one of the best 15 places to retire in Connecticut. RelocateAmerica.com ranked Trumbull in their annual list of America's "Top 100 Places to Live". Money magazine ranked Trumbull #68 in their 100 best places to live rankings of U.S. cities in 2007 and #77 in 2009.

Notable people

 Lee Abbamonte, travel blogger and the youngest American to visit all 193 United Nations member states
 Dick Allen (1939–2017), American poet and poet laureate of the state of Connecticut
 John W. Beach (born 1825), seventh President of Wesleyan University
 James Beebe (1717–1785), Reverend at Unity Parish, Army Preacher in the French and Indian War and patriot
 Truman Bradley (1826–1900), American Indian from the Schaghticoke tribe
 Craig Breslow (born 1980), professional baseball player (pitcher) Oakland Athletics and Boston Red Sox, 1998 Trumbull High School graduate
 P. W. Catanese, author of the Books of Umber and Further Tales Adventures series
 Joseph DiMenna, hedge-fund manager and patron of the arts
 Nancy DiNardo, Chairwoman of the Democratic Party of Connecticut
 Chris Drury, professional hockey player, won the Stanley Cup, 2-time Olympic silver medalist and member of the 1989 Little League World Series championship team from Trumbull
 Ted Drury, former NHL player
 Felly, rapper
 Will Geer (1902–1978), actor and folklorist, maintained "Geer-Gore Gardens"

 Nero Hawley (1742–1817), slave, served in the Continental Army earning his freedom

 Robert Hawley (1729–1799), Captain North Stratford Train Band in the American Revolutionary War
 Carolyn Hax (born 1966), writer and columnist for The Washington Post and the author of the advice column "Tell Me About It"
 Tony Horton, actor, personal trainer and creator of p90x home fitness program
 Harvey Hubbell (1857–1927), inventor
 Joseph Judson (1619–1690), early settler, militia officer and local official. Negotiated the purchase of Long Hill area from the Paugussett Indians
 Burt Kearns, television and motion picture writer and producer, journalist and Tabloid Baby author
 Lisa Lampanelli, comedian, actress and writer
 January LaVoy, Broadway and television actress
 Mark Longwell, professional soccer player and United States men's national soccer team member
 Brian E. Luther, U.S. Navy Rear Admiral
 Manya Makoski, professional soccer player (Los Angeles Sol)
 Charlie Morton, two-time MLB All-Star pitcher for the Tampa Bay Rays, who was the winning pitcher in Game 7 of the 2017 World Series with the Houston Astros
 Alyssa Naeher, United States women's national soccer team goalkeeper in the 2019 FIFA Women's World Cup
 Igor Sikorsky (1889–1972), aviation pioneer and helicopter inventor
 Benjamin Silliman (1779–1864), first professor of science at Yale and first to distill petroleum
 Chris Soule, Olympic skeleton (sport) athlete
 Jim Tennant, former MLB player

Sister city
 Xinyi, Jiangsu (China), since 2008. A plaque in Twin Brooks Park commemorates this friendship.

See also

 Ephraim Hawley House
 Golden Hill Paugussett Indian Nation
 Gregory's Four Corners Burial Ground
 Little League World Series Trumbull 1989 World Champions
 Nichols Farms Historic District
 Unity Burial Ground

References

Sources
 Reverend Orcutt, History of the Old Town of Stratford and the City of Bridgeport, Connecticut, Fairfield Historical Society, 1886
 History of Trumbull Dodrasquicentennial 1797–1972 Commemorative Book, Trumbull Historical Society, 1972
 Isaac William Stuart, Life of Jonathan Trumbull Sen., Governor of Connecticut, Crocker and Brewster, 1859
 Henry Phelps Johnston, The Yorktown Campaign and the Surrender of Cornwallis, 1781, Ayer Publishing, 1971
 Charles S. Hall, Life and Letters of Samuel Holden Parsons, Ostenigo Publishing Co., Binghamton, NY, 1905
 E. Merrill Beach, "They Face the Rising Sun", Trumbull Historical Society, 1971
 E. Merrill Beach, "Trumbull, Church and Town", Trumbull Historical Society, 1972
 Dorothy Seeley, "Tales of Trumbull's Past", Trumbull Historical Society, 1984

External links

Town of Trumbull official website
Trumbull Historical Society

Trumbull, Connecticut
Towns in Fairfield County, Connecticut
Populated places established in 1797
Populated places established in 1639
Towns in the New York metropolitan area
Towns in Connecticut
1639 establishments in Connecticut